The women's omnium is one of the 9 women's events at the 2010 UCI Track Cycling World Championships, held in Ballerup, Denmark.

This was the second time a women's omnium event had ever been included in the World Championships. 17 cyclists from 17 countries participated in the contest. The omnium consisted of five events, which were all contested on 27 March: a sprint 200 m time trial with a flying start, scratch race, 2 km individual pursuit, points race and a 500 m time trial.

Overall standings

References

Women's omnium
UCI Track Cycling World Championships – Women's omnium